Ryan Christopher Neal (born December 24, 1995) is an American football strong safety for the Seattle Seahawks of the National Football League (NFL). He played college football at Southern Illinois.

College career
Neal played four seasons at Southern Illinois, compiling 226 career tackles, 6.5 tackles for loss, five interceptions and 19 passes defensed. As a senior, Neal led the team with three interceptions and tied for the team lead with 84 tackles and was named honorable mention All-Missouri Valley Football Conference.

Professional career

Philadelphia Eagles
Neal signed with the Philadelphia Eagles as an undrafted free agent on April 28, 2018. He was waived by the team during training camp on August 6, 2018.

Atlanta Falcons
Neal was signed by the Atlanta Falcons on August 11, 2018. However, he failed to make the 53-man roster out of training camp and was subsequently re-signed by the Falcons to the team's practice squad on September 2, 2018. Neal was promoted to the Falcons active roster on November 28, 2018. Neal made his NFL debut on December 9, 2018, in a 34-20 loss to the Green Bay Packers, playing on special teams in the only regular season appearance of his rookie season. Neal was waived by the Falcons as part of the team's final roster cuts on August 31, 2019.

Seattle Seahawks
Neal was signed to the Seattle Seahawks practice squad on September 2, 2019. The Seahawks promoted Neal to the active roster on December 11, 2019.

Neal re-signed with the Seahawks on April 20, 2020. He was waived on September 5, 2020, and signed to the practice squad the next day. He was elevated to the active roster on September 26 for the team's week 3 game against the Dallas Cowboys. With six seconds remaining in the game, he intercepted Dak Prescott in the end zone, sealing a 38–31 victory for the Seahawks. After automatically reverting to the practice squad following the game, Neal was promoted to the active roster on September 30, 2020. On October 4, 2020, with Adams and Lano Hill still injured, he made his first start for the Seahawks in a game against the Miami Dolphins. Neal made 6 tackles, and also collected his second interception, from Ryan Fitzpatrick.

Neal signed a one-year exclusive-rights free agent tender with the Seahawks on June 8, 2021.

Personal life
Neal is the younger brother of former Green Bay Packers linebacker Mike Neal.

References

External links
Southern Illinois Salukis bio
Seattle Seahawks bio

1995 births
Living people
Sportspeople from Hammond, Indiana
Players of American football from Indiana
American football safeties
Southern Illinois Salukis football players
Philadelphia Eagles players
Atlanta Falcons players
Seattle Seahawks players